"State I'm In" is the third single from American Christian rock band Needtobreathe's fifth studio album, Rivers in the Wasteland. It was released on February 17, 2014, by Atlantic Records, Word Records and Curb Records, and the song was written by Bear and Bo Rinehart. On May 3, 2014, the band performed the song "State I'm In" on CBS This Morning: Saturday, as a web exclusive bonus.

Track listing

Charts

References 
 

2014 singles
2014 songs
Needtobreathe songs
Atlantic Records singles
Curb Records singles